The behavioral approach to systems theory and control theory was initiated in the late-1970s by J. C. Willems as a result of resolving inconsistencies present in classical approaches based on state-space, transfer function, and convolution representations. This approach is also motivated by the aim of obtaining a general framework for system analysis and control that respects the underlying physics.

The main object in the behavioral setting is the behavior – the set of all signals compatible with the system. An important feature of the behavioral approach is that it does not distinguish a priority between input and output variables. Apart from putting system theory and control on a rigorous basis, the behavioral approach unified the existing approaches and brought new results on controllability for nD systems, control via interconnection, and system identification.

Dynamical system as a set of signals 

In the behavioral setting, a dynamical system is a triple 
 
where
  is the "time set" – the time instances over which the system evolves,
  is the "signal space" – the set in which the variables whose time evolution is modeled take on their values, and 
  the "behavior" – the set of signals that are compatible with the laws of the system 
( denotes the set of all signals, i.e., functions from  into ). 
 means that  is a trajectory of the system, while  means that the laws of the system forbid the trajectory  to happen.

Special cases:
  – continuous-time systems 
  – discrete-time systems 
  – most physical systems
  a finite set – discrete event systems

Linear time-invariant differential systems 

System properties are defined in terms of the behavior. The system  is said to be 
 "time-invariant" if the time set consists of the real or natural numbers and
 for all ,
where  denotes the -shift, defined by 
. 
In these definitions linearity articulates the superposition law, while time-invariance articulates that the time-shift of a legal trajectory is in its turn a legal trajectory.

A "linear time-invariant differential system" is a dynamical system  whose behavior  is the solution set of a system of constant coefficient linear ordinary differential equations , where  is a matrix of polynomials with real coefficients. For ease of exposition, often infinite differentiable solutions are considered. The behavior defined is

This particular way of representing the system is called "kernel representation" of the corresponding dynamical system. There are many other useful representations of the same behavior, including transfer function, state space, and convolution.

For accessible sources regarding the behavioral approach, see 

.

Observability of latent variables 

A key question of the behavioral approach is whether a quantity w1 can be deduced given an observed quantity w2 and a model. If w1 can be deduced given w2 and the model, w2 is said to be observable. In terms of mathematical modeling, the to-be-deduced quantity or variable is often referred to as the latent variable and the observed variable is the manifest variable. Such a system is then called an observable (latent variable) system.

References

Additional sources 

Paolo Rapisarda and Jan C.Willems, 2006. Recent Developments in Behavioral System Theory, July 24–28, 2006, MTNS 2006, Kyoto, Japan
J.C. Willems. Terminals and ports. IEEE Circuits and Systems Magazine Volume 10, issue 4, pages 8–16, December 2010
J.C. Willems and H.L. Trentelman. On quadratic differential forms.  SIAM Journal on Control and Optimization Volume 36, pages 1702-1749, 1998
J.C. Willems. Paradigms and puzzles in the theory of dynamical systems.  IEEE Transactions on Automatic Control Volume 36, pages 259-294, 1991
J.C. Willems. Models for dynamics. Dynamics Reported Volume 2, pages 171-269, 1989

Systems theory
Dynamical systems